Avenue B is the twelfth studio album by American rock singer Iggy Pop, released in 1999.

A music video was made for the single "Corruption."

The album cover was shot by Jeff Wall.

Critical reception 
"Avenue B" elicited a mixed reaction from music critics. The album holds a score of 52/100 on review aggregate site Album of the Year, indicating mixed reviews.

Track listing
All tracks composed by Iggy Pop, except where noted

"No Shit" – 1:21
"Nazi Girlfriend" – 2:57
"Avenue B" – 5:19
"Miss Argentina" – 4:14
"Afraid to Get Close" – 0:59
"Shakin' All Over" (Johnny Kidd) – 4:35
"Long Distance" – 4:56
"Corruption" (Hal Cragin, Whitey Kirst, Pop) – 4:23
"She Called Me Daddy" – 1:52
"I Felt the Luxury" (William Martin, John Medeski, Pop, Christopher Wood) – 6:30
"Español" (Whitey Kirst, Pop) – 4:10
"Motorcycle" – 2:42
"Facade" – 5:28

B-sides and alternate versions
 "Corruption" (Single edit) – 4:00
 "Rock Star Grave" (B-side to "Corruption") – 4:30
 "Hollywood Affair" (featuring Johnny Depp; B-side to "Corruption") – 2:53

Personnel
Iggy Pop – vocals, guitar, keyboards 
Whitey Kirst – guitar
Pete "Damien" Marshall – guitar
Lenny Castro – percussion on "Avenue B" and "Español"
Hal Cragin – bass
David Mansfield – violin, viola
John Medeski – Hammond organ, Wurlitzer
Larry Mullins – drums, tabla, vibraphone, treated 808
Billy Martin – drums
Andrew Scheps – loops, mixing on "Shakin' All Over"
Chris Wood – bass
Michael Chaves – keyboards on "Nazi Girlfriend"
Don Was – guitar on "Long Distance"

Charts

Sales

References

External links 

 

Iggy Pop albums
1999 albums
Albums produced by Don Was
Virgin Records albums